Prokoško Lake is a lake of Bosnia and Herzegovina.

The lake is visited by 20,000 tourists each year.

See also
List of lakes in Bosnia and Herzegovina

References

External links

Lakes of Bosnia and Herzegovina